The women's slalom was contested on Wednesday, 22 February. Janica Kostelić led in the slalom World Cup with 460 points, and was also defending World and Olympic champion, but she finished  0.15 seconds behind Marlies Schild for the 4th place. Anja Pärson got her first Olympic gold medal.

Results
Complete results for the Women's Slalom event at the 2006 Winter Olympics.

References

External links
Official Olympic Report

Slalom